Nao Hibino was the defending champion, but chose to participate in Montreal instead.

Michaëlla Krajicek won the title, defeating Arina Rodionova in the final, 6–0, 2–6, 6–2.

Seeds

Main draw

Finals

Top half

Bottom half

References 
 Main draw

Kentucky Bank Tennis Championships - Singles